Xavier Duursma (born 7 July 2000) is a professional Australian rules footballer who plays for the Port Adelaide Football Club in the Australian Football League (AFL). He was recruited by Port Adelaide with the 18th draft pick in the 2018 AFL Draft.

AFL career
Duursma made his AFL debut in Port Adelaide's win over Melbourne in the opening round of the 2019 AFL season. He scored a goal on debut.

Personal life

Duursma is the nephew of former , Brisbane and  player Jamie Duursma

Goal celebration
Duursma has become known for his bow and arrow goal celebration. The celebration has been both heavily praised and criticised in the media. It earned him the nickname sharpshooter.

References

External links

2000 births
Living people
Port Adelaide Football Club players
Australian rules footballers from Victoria (Australia)